TerminusDB is an open source knowledge graph and document store. It is used to build versioned data products. It is a native revision control database that is architecturally similar to Git. It is listed on DB-Engines. 

TerminusDB provides a document API for building via the JSON exchange format. It implements both GraphQL and a datalog variant called WOQL. TerminusCMS is a cloud self-serve content and data platform built on TerminusDB

TerminusDB is available under the Apache 2.0 license. TerminusDB is implemented in Prolog and Rust.

History 
TerminusDB, previously known as DataChemist, was founded in Dublin, Ireland. Starting in Trinity College Dublin, the development team behind TerminusDB ran the Horizon 2020 project ALIGNED that worked from February 2015 to January 2018. An open-access e-book entitled Engineering Agile Big-Data Systems was published on completion of the ALIGNED project. The results of some aspects of this research, focused on the relationship between complex societies and moralizing gods, appeared in Nature.

Version 1.0 was released in October 2019. TerminusDB was first released under the GPLv3 license with the client libraries released with the Apache 2 license. With v4.0, which was released in December 2020, TerminusDB switched to the Apache 2.0 license. The shift was discussed extensively.

Release history

Name 
TerminusDB is named after the Roman God of Boundaries, Terminus. It is also named after the home planet of the Foundation in the series of science-fiction novel by Issac Asimov. TerminusDB uses a CowDuck mascot - the motif finds its origins in the examples used by core engineer Matthijs van Otterdijk when first demonstrating the append only immutable data store

Software design 
TerminusDB is an in-memory graph database management system with a rich query language. The design of the underlying data structure, which is implemented in a Rust library, uses a succinct data structures and delta encoding approach drawing inspiration from software source control systems like Git. This allows all of the Git semantics to be used in TerminusDB.

Data model 
TerminusDB is based on the RDF standard. This standard specifies finite labelled directed graphs which are parameterized in some universe of datatypes. The names for nodes and labels are drawn from a set of IRIs (Internationalized Resource Identifiers). TerminusDB uses the XSD datatypes as its universe of concrete values. For schema design, TerminusDB used the OWL language until version 10.0. Since version 10 it uses a JSON schema interface allowing users to build schemas using a simple JSON format. This provides a rich modelling language which enables constraints on the allowable shapes in the graph. 

TerminusDB has a promise based client for the browser and node.js it is available through the npm registry, or can be directly included in web-sites.  It also has a Python client for the TerminusDB RESTful API and a python version of the web object query language, WOQLpy.

Query language 
GraphQL is implemented to allow users to query TerminusDB projects in such a way that deep linking can be discovered.

WOQL (web object query language) is a datalog-based query language. It allows TerminusDB to treat the database as a document store or a graph interchangeably, and provides query features to make relationship traversals easy. This gives a relatively straightforward human-readable format which can be easily stored in TerminusDB itself.

Example 
A simple query which creates a document in the database, along with labels and cardinality constraints.
   
WOQL.doctype("BankAccount").label("Bank Account")
    .property("owner","xsd:string")
       .label("owner")
       .cardinality(1)
    .property("balance","xsd:nonNegativeInteger")
       .label("owner")
       .cardinality(1)

TerminusCMS 
TerminusCMS is a headless open-source content management system that uses a model-driven, API-first approach to content management. The CMS is built on TerminusDB and focused on software engineer users. It was released in February 2023

References

External links
 

Graph databases
Structured storage
Free database management systems
Software companies of Ireland
Free software programmed in Rust
Logic programming
2019 software
NoSQL
Software using the GPL license